The 1997–98 TCU Horned Frogs men's basketball team represented Texas Christian University as a member of the Southwestern Conference during the 1997–98 men's college basketball season. Led by head coach Billy Tubbs, TCU swept through the WAC regular season schedule to earn the regular season title and received an at-large bid to the NCAA tournament as No. 5 seed in the Midwest region. The Horned Frogs were upset in the opening round by No. 12 seed Florida State, 96–87. The team finished with a record of 27–6 (14–0 WAC).

This high-scoring TCU team posted more than 100 points in seven straight games early in the season (peaking with 153 vs. Texas-Rio Grande Valley), exceeded the century mark 14 times on the season in all, and scored 99 points twice more.

Junior forward Lee Nailon established school records for scoring in a single game (53; three games after senior Mike Jones became the first TCU player to score 50 in a game) and season single season (796). He was also named co-Player of the Year in the WAC. Jones and fellow senior Malcolm Johnson finished 1–2 on the single season and career steals lists, while senior James Penny ended his career as the school's all-time leader in blocks (all of which have since been surpassed).

Roster

Schedule and results

|-
!colspan=9 style=| Regular season

|-
!colspan=9 style=| WAC tournament

|-
!colspan=9 style=| NCAA tournament

Rankings

References 

TCU Horned Frogs men's basketball seasons
TCU
TCU Basketball
TCU Basketball
TCU